I Shot Billy the Kid is a 1950 American Western film directed by William Berke for Lippert Pictures.

Robert L. Lippert had enjoyed tremendous success with I Shot Jesse James (1948) leading to this follow up with I Shot Billy the Kid.

Plot
Pat Garrett remembers his relationship with Billy the Kid that led to the latter's death.

Cast
 Don "Red" Barry as Billy the Kid
 Robert Lowery as Pat Garrett
 Wally Vernon as Vicenti
 Tom Neal as Charlie Bowdre
 Judith Allen as Mrs. Alec McSween
 Wendy Lee as Francesca
 Claude Stroud as General Lew Wallace
 John Merton as Ollinger
 Henry Marco as Juan
 Bill Kennedy as Poe
 Archie R. Twitchell as Grant
 Jack Perrin as Man
 Richard Farmer as McSween

Reception
It was released on a double-bill with The Lawless.

References

External links
 
 
 I Shot Billy the Kid at BFI
 I Shot Billy the Kid at Letter Box

1950 films
Biographical films about Billy the Kid
Cultural depictions of Pat Garrett
1950 Western (genre) films
American Western (genre) films
1950s English-language films
Lippert Pictures films
Films directed by William A. Berke
Films scored by Albert Glasser
American black-and-white films
Revisionist Western (genre) films
1950s American films